MACS J0717.5+3745 (MACS J0717 or MACS 0717 for short) is a large galaxy cluster located 5.4 billion light years away in the constellation Auriga, appearing in the Massive Cluster Survey (MACS).

Description
The cluster was formed by four separate galaxy clusters that have been involved in a collision. This is the first time that this phenomenon has been observed. The repeated collisions in MACSJ0717 are caused by a 13-million-light-year-long stream of galaxies, gas, and dark matter, known as a filament, pouring into a region already full of matter. When two or more of the galaxy clusters collide, the hot gas in the interstellar medium slows down, but the galaxies, composed mostly of empty space, do not slow as fast. The speed and direction of each of the clusters involved in the collision can thus be approximated through examining the offset between the galaxies and the gas.

Of the four subclusters, A, B, C, D, subcluster B is moving quickly relative to the other three subclusters, which are relatively at rest in relation to each other. The quick moving B exhibits kinetic Sunyaev-Zel'dovich effect (SZ effect for short), the first time this has been observed in an object, instead of statistically. The B subcluster's kinetic SZ effect was discovered due to its lack of a thermal SZ effect, unlike the other three subclusters.

MACS J0717 forms one of the largest known Einstein rings, with gravitational lensing distorting the light that reaches us from several adjacent phenomena.

Gallery

See also
Galaxies
Supercluster
Sloan Great Wall
Chandra X-ray Observatory

References

External links 
 
 Chandra X-ray Center
 Galaxy Cluster MACS J0717 ESA/Hubble Image

Galaxy clusters
Auriga (constellation)